Listen To The Crows As They Take Flight is the fourth album by Kid Dakota. It was released on October 11, 2011, by Graveface Records.

Track listing

Personnel
Kid Dakota
 Darren Jackson - lead vocals, guitar

Production
 Additional contributions from Eliza Blue, Dosh, and Haley Bonar.

External links 
 Band and album's description on the label's website.

Kid Dakota albums
2011 albums
Graveface Records albums